FCCJ may refer to:

 Florida Community College at Jacksonville
 Foreign Correspondents' Club of Japan